2nd arrondissement may refer to:
France
 2nd arrondissement of Lyon
 2nd arrondissement of Marseille
 2nd arrondissement of Paris
Benin
 2nd arrondissement of Parakou
 2nd arrondissement of Porto-Novo
 2nd arrondissement of the Littoral Department

Arrondissement name disambiguation pages